Pandulf (sometimes spelled Pandulph or Pandolph) may refer to:

Pandulf of Pisa, 12th-century Italian cardinal
Pandulf Verraccio (died 1226), papal legate to England and Bishop of Norwich 
Pandulf Ironhead (died 981)
Pandulf II of Benevento (died 1014), also known as Pandulf the Old
Pandulf II of Capua (died 983)
Pandulf II of Salerno (died 983)
Pandulf III of Benevento (died 1060)
Pandulf IV of Benevento (died 1074)
Pandulf IV of Capua (died 1050)
Pandulf V of Capua (died after 1027)
Pandulf VI of Capua (died 1057)

See also
Pandolfo (disambiguation), the Italian form of the name

Italian masculine given names